Project Marathwada is a 2016 Indian Hindi-language drama film, made by the Producer-Director duo of Prakash Patel and Bhavin Wadia, along with Niraj Laxmikant Patel, Praful Patel, Sandip Patil, Sadiya Khan & Bhavin Wadia as Co-Producer. The film is based on the issue of Farmer Suicides in India and stars Om Puri as a distressed farmer, Tukaram.

The films also stars Govind Namdeo, Dalip Tahil, Kunal Seth, Seema Biswas, Rahul Patel, and Farrah Kader. It follows the story of a Marathwada-based indebted farmer, who comes to Mumbai hoping for help from the Government after his son commits suicide. The story takes a twist when he comes across four college students making a documentary on the same subject. The first look of the film was released on 22 September 2015.

References

External links
 

2016 films
2010s Hindi-language films